Albert Robinson (1 June 1948 – June 1995) was an English footballer, who played as an inside forward in the Football League for Chester.

References

Chester City F.C. players
Runcorn F.C. Halton players
Association football inside forwards
English Football League players
1948 births
1995 deaths
People from Chester
English footballers